Duman is a surname. Notable people with the surname include:

Aslı Duman (born 1992), Turkish female water polo player
Ayşenur Duman (born 1999), Turkish female Olympian cross-country skier
Besra Duman (born 2001), Turkish Paralympic powerlifter
Hatice Duman (born 1974), Turkish female journalist and editor
Hatice Duman (table tennis) (born 1994), Turkish para table tennis player
Nikol Duman (1867–1914), Armenian fedayee
Nurduran Duman (born 1974), Turkish poet, writer, essayist, translator
Osman Kürşat Duman (born 1987), Turkish footballer
Ronald Duman, American medical researcher 
Ronnie Duman (1929–1968), American racecar driver
Sibel Duman (born 1990), Turkish female footballer

See also
Duman (band), Turkish Rock band
Duman, Çan
Duman, Karaçoban
Duman, Susurluk, a village in Turkey
Duman, Islamabad, a town in Pakistan
The Duman River, which flows between Russia and North Korea
Duman, a variant of pinipig in Philippine cuisine

Turkish-language surnames